The 1990 Spengler Cup was held in Davos, Switzerland from December 26 to December 31, 1990.  All matches were played at HC Davos's home arena, Eisstadion Davos. The final was won 8-3 by HC Spartak Moscow over Team Canada.

Teams participating
 HC Spartak Moscow
 Team Canada
 Färjestads BK
 HC Dukla Jihlava
 EHC Kloten

Tournament

Round-Robin results

Finals

External links
Spenglercup.ch
Hockeyarchives
Hockeyarenas

1990-91
1990–91 in Swiss ice hockey
1990–91 in Soviet ice hockey
1990–91 in Canadian ice hockey
1990–91 in Czechoslovak ice hockey
1990–91 in Swedish ice hockey